Cheng Ran (Chinese language: 程然) is a Chinese contemporary artist known for his film and video works.

Biography
Cheng Ran was born in 1981 in Inner Mongolia, China. In 2004, he graduated from China Academy of Art. Currently he lives and works in Hangzhou, China.

Work
Cheng mainly focuses on new media and his artworks are mostly videos and films. Cheng's works are created by applying basic cinematic techniques like simple cutting, rearranging, montage, full length shot and so on. Usually, his videos do not have complete and coherent storylines, and sentiment is the main part to show.

In 2012, Cheng Ran participated in artist Michael Lin's exhibition "Model Home" at Rockbund Art Museum in Shanghai. Working with Lin, Cheng recorded the whole process of the preparation and the construction work of the exhibition and then presented the videos in the final show.

Cheng Ran is represented by LEO XU Projects.

Awards
In 2011 he won the "Best Video Artist" in Dead Rabbit Awards held by online art magazine Randian. The winning piece "Chewing Gum Papers” is a simultaneously hypnotic and sinister combined with Martin Luther King’s “I have a dream” speech as the background sound; and it is also a piece of commissioned work for LEO XU PROJECTS's inaugural show "Sweet Dreams (Are Made of This)". In 2019 Cheng won the Nomura Emerging Artist Award, valued at 100,000 USD.

Solo exhibitions

2016 
The New Museum, New York.

2011
"Hot Blood, Warm Blood, Cold Blood", Galerie Urs Meile, Beijing-Lucerne, Beijing
"Circadian Rhythm", Qingying Gallery, Hangzhou

2009
"Immersion and Distance", Ullens Center for Contemporary Art, Beijing

References

External links
 Cheng Ran's page at LEO XU PROJECTS
 Cheng Ran's entry in ARTLINKART

Chinese contemporary artists
Chinese video artists
Living people
Artists from Inner Mongolia
Year of birth missing (living people)